Sang-won is a Korean masculine given name. Its meaning depends on the hanja used to write each syllable of the name. There are 35 hanja with the reading "sang" and 35 hanja with the reading "won" on the South Korean government's official list of hanja which may be registered for use in given names. 

People with this name include:
Oh Sangwon (1930–1985), South Korean journalist
Sang Won Park (born 1950), South Korean-born American traditional Korean musician
Park Sang-won (born 1959), South Korean actor
Gwon Sang-won (born 1969), South Korean swimmer
Jang Sang-won (born 1977), South Korean football midfielder (K-League Classic)
Back Sang-won (born 1988), South Korean baseball player (Korea Baseball Organization)
Kim Sang-won (born 1992), South Korean football defender (K-League Classic)
Sang Won Kang, South Korean biologist

See also
List of Korean given names

References

Korean masculine given names